Kayleigh Marit Ellen van Dooren (born 31 July 1999) is a Dutch professional footballer who plays as a midfielder for Eredivisie club Twente and the Netherlands national team.

Club career
Van Dooren started her career with her hometown club RKVVO in 2004. She joined CTO Eindhoven in 2014.

In May 2018, Van Dooren signed a two-year contract with Eredivisie club PSV. She made her league debut on 7 September 2018 in a 1–0 defeat against Twente. After a successful season in which she scored eight goals from 22 league matches, she extended her contract until the end of the 2020–21 season.

Van Dooren joined Twente in June 2021 on a two-year deal.

International career
Van Dooren has represented Netherlands at various youth levels. In February 2022, she was called up to the Netherlands national team for 2022 Tournoi de France. She made her debut on 19 February in a 3–0 win against Finland.

Career statistics

International

Honours
PSV
 KNVB Women's Cup: 2020–21

Twente
 Eredivisie: 2021–22
 Eredivisie Cup: 2021–22
 Dutch Women's Super Cup: 2022

References

External links
 
Senior national team profile at Onsoranje.nl (in Dutch)
Under-23 national team profile at Onsoranje.nl (in Dutch)
Under-19 national team profile at Onsoranje.nl (in Dutch)
Under-17 national team profile at Onsoranje.nl (in Dutch)
Under-16 national team profile at Onsoranje.nl (in Dutch)
Under-15 national team profile at Onsoranje.nl (in Dutch)

1999 births
Living people
Women's association football midfielders
Dutch women's footballers
Netherlands women's international footballers
Eredivisie (women) players
PSV (women) players
FC Twente (women) players